Hyperlais glyceralis is a species of moth in the family Crambidae. It was described by Otto Staudinger in 1859 and is found in Spain.

The wingspan is 12–20 mm.

References

Moths described in 1859
Cybalomiinae